Possum grape is a common name for several fruit-bearing vines indigenous to North America. It is named after the unincorporated community in Arkansas. 

Possum grape may refer to:

Botany
Ampelopsis cordata
Cissus incisa
Cissus verticillata
Cissus trifoliata
Vitis baileyana
Vitis cinerea
Vitis cordifolia
Vitis vulpina

Other uses
Possum Grape, Arkansas